The 1959–60 Kangaroo tour was the tenth Kangaroo tour, in which the Australian national rugby league team traveled to Europe and played thirty-seven matches against British, French and Italian teams, including the Ashes series of three Test matches against Great Britain, two Test matches against the French and an additional two non-Test matches against an Italian representative team. It followed the tour of 1956-57 and the next was staged in 1963-64.

The squad's leadership 
The team was coached by Clive Churchill. The team captain was Balmain Tigers  Keith Barnes while the vice-captain was Manly-Warringah's dual rugby international forward Rex Mossop. Tour co-managers were Jack Argent and Ern Keffer.
In the five matches in which neither Barnes nor Mossop played, the Kangaroos were captained by five different players: Harry Wells (against Leigh), Brian Hambly (combined Workington and Whitehaven), Brian Clay (Bradford Northern), Brian Carlson (Swinton) and Billy Wilson (Huddersfield).

Touring squad 
The Rugby League News published a photo and details of the touring team including the players' ages and weights. 
Match details - listing surnames of both teams and the point scorers - were included in E.E. Christensen's Official Rugby League Yearbook, as was a summary of the players' point-scoring. 
Beattie, Boden, Kelly, Muir, Parcell, Paterson and Rasmussen were selected from Queensland clubs. Chapman, Hambly, Parish and Walsh were selected from clubs in New South Wales Country areas. The balance of the squad had played for Sydney based clubs during the 1959 season.

Great Britain 
The largest non-test attendance of the tour was 29,156 when the Kangaroos defeated St. Helens at Knowsley Road.

Test Venues 
The three Ashes series tests took place at the following venues.

The Ashes series 
The Ashes series against Great Britain saw an aggregate crowd of 91,604 attending the Test series. The largest attendance of the tour came during the Kangaroos 22-14 first test win over Great Britain at Station Road in Swinton with 35,224 in attendance.

First Test 
The first Ashes series test was played at Station Road, Swinton and drew the tours largest attendance of 35,224. Australia won the first test 22-14 with Reg Gasnier playing in his first ever test match against Great Britain named as the man of the match with 3 tries.

5 days prior to the match against Bradford Northern, the Kangaroos played the first test against France.

Second Test 
The Kangaroos went within one penalty goal of becoming the first All-Australian team to win The Ashes on British soil and the first touring side to win The Ashes since 1911-12. However, the Lions survived and the series would go on to a deciding 3rd test.

Third Test 
This would be the final time that Great Britain (or England) would win the Ashes on home soil (as of 2017).

France 
The first two games of the French leg of the tour were actually played while The Kangaroos were still completing the British leg.

First Test 
Australia won the first test against the French at the Parc des Princes in Paris. Kangaroos winger Eddie Lumsden crossed for 3 tries while legendary winger Ken Irvine made the first of 33 test appearances for Australia.

The game against the French Army XIII was played 4 days before the third Ashes test against Great Britain

Second Test

Third Test

Italy 
To finish the tour, the Kangaroos played two games against an Italian representative team.

Ken Irvine crossed for 6 tries in this game.

References

External links 
 1959-60 Kangaroo Tour at Rugby League Project

Australia national rugby league team tours
Rugby league tours of Great Britain
Rugby league tours of France
Rugby league tours of Italy
Kangaroo tour
Kangaroo tour